Sunset Beach DJ Session 2 is a 2012 release from the German musician and DJ André Tanneberger.

Following his first studio LPs and the "Sunset Beach DJ Session" series which he launched in 2010, André Tanneberger has revealed another of his musical passions alongside melodic, pulsating club music, namely ambient. "I love ambient and really like listening to it. I have been creating songs in this genre for years. It’s great fun and I find it relaxing," Tanneberger explains.

Consequently, Tanneberger presented a new edition of the artist compilation series ATB "Sunset Beach DJ Session". As on the first, the second volume feature an exquisite selection of brand new club tracks on CD1, expertly mixed by André into a complete ATB DJ set. CD2 presents an overview of the finest tracks in the ambient genre with a fantastic blend of current tracks and timeless classics.

"Sunset Beach DJ Session 2" also showcases brand new ATB tracks. Each of the two discs promises three new and exclusive ATB tracks. "Together with my friend Rudi Dittmann a.k.a. Josh Gallahan and the man behind the RuDee and Anova pseudonyms, I produced the club track "ATB with Rudee feat. Ramona Nerra – In And Out Of Love" and the chill out song "ATB feat. Anova – Sunset Beach", both of which can be found on the compilation," André explains.
"I have taken the plunge and had a first go at a chill out track for "Sunset Beach DJ Session 2", produced together with Amurai who is an unbelievably talented producer. I really enjoy working with him on new ideas. Even though he is based in Los Angeles, internet makes it possible to work together intensively, no matter how far apart we are geographically." .

"Add to that the fact that I came back from my latest gigs with so many ideas, tracks like "All You Took" and "With You!" more or less happened over night. I am really happy to be offering so many new ATB tracks to my fans on the new compilation," André enthuses.

"Sunset Beach DJ Session 2" sees ATB take his listeners "on a musical journey, like at my gigs".

Track list
Disc one

 ATB with Rudee feat. Ramona Nerra – In And Out Of Love
 Norin & Rad vs. Audien – Triumph
 Probe – Baila
 ATB feat. Ramona Nerra – Never Give Up
 Antillas feat. Fiora – Damaged
 Markus Schulz presents Dakota – Gypsy Room (Duderstadt remix)
 LTN – Ordinary People (D-Mad remix)
 Stereojackers – Offshore
 The Thrillseekers feat. Fisher – The Last Time (Johan Malmgren 2012 remix)
 The Madison & Simon J – Follow Up
 Hazem Beltagui – Into The Blue
 ATB feat. Amurai – All You Took
 Mike Danis – For You (Juventa club mix)
 Fade – Beautiful Moment

Disc two
 ATB feat. Anova – Sunset Beach
 Andain – Much Too Much (Zetandel Chill remix)
 Klangstein feat. Sine – Klangsine
 ATB presents Amurai – Love & Light (Downtempo mix)
 ATB – With You!
 Virtual Riot feat. Amba Shepherd – Superhuman (Titchimoto remix)
 Coastline – Adriatic Sea (DJ Milews RMX)
 Gary B – Time To Slow It Down
 Polished Chrome – Desire
 Asheni – Lost In Time
 Kaskade feat. Skylar Grey – Room For Happiness (Kaskade's ICE mix)
 Summer Of Space – Beautiful People
 Sine – Wolke
 Sine – Chillbar
 Eva Cassidy – Fields Of Gold

External links
 ATB's official website
 ATB's official Facebook page
 ATB artist page on Dancefield
 Official ATB YouTube channel
 "Sunset Beach DJ Session 2" Minimix

ATB albums
DJ mix albums
2012 compilation albums